Reinout Scholte (born 10 August 1967) is a former Dutch international cricketer. He played as a right-handed batsman and a right-arm medium-fast bowler, but usually occupied the position of wicket-keeper. He played for HBS and VOC in Dutch domestic cricket.

Scholte served as the vice-captain, and intermittently took on the role of captain, of the 2002 ICC Champions Trophy squad. His wicket-keeping was the main asset to Holland as they qualified for the 2001 ICC Trophy.

Scholte has two children; his son also plays cricket for HBS.

Sources
Reinout Scholte at ESPNcricinfo

1967 births
Living people
Dutch cricketers
Netherlands One Day International cricketers
Cricketers at the 1996 Cricket World Cup
Cricketers at the 2003 Cricket World Cup
Sportspeople from The Hague
Wicket-keepers